Herbert Greene may refer to:
Herbert Greene (Broadway conductor) (1921–1985), American musician, conductor, arranger and voice teacher
Herbert Greene (musician) (1907–1980), English accordionist
Herbert M. Greene (1871–1932), American architect 
Herb Greene (born 1942), American photographer
Herb Greene (architect) (born 1929), American architect and painter

See also
Herbert Green (disambiguation)
Bert Greene (disambiguation)